Paraechinus is a genus of hedgehogs. Members are small and nocturnal. The genus contains four species from North Africa, the Middle East and South Asia:

 Desert hedgehog (Paraechinus aethiopicus)
 Brandt's hedgehog (Paraechinus hypomelas)
 Indian hedgehog (Paraechinus micropus)
 Bare-bellied hedgehog (Paraechinus nudiventris)
Locomotory activity patterns

The locomotory activity of the Desert hedgehog (Paraechinus aethiopicus) occurred during the dark phases of both long and short day cycles. Therefore this species is considered nocturnal.

References

 
Hedgehogs
Mammal genera